Wildau  is a railway station for the village of Wildau in Brandenburg.

References

Wildau
Railway stations in Brandenburg
Buildings and structures in Dahme-Spreewald